Euxesta notata is a species of ulidiid or picture-winged fly in the genus Euxesta of the family Ulidiidae. It is found in Canada. As a larvae it is referred to as the spotted root maggot, and has evolved genetic resistance against DDT.

References

notata
Insects of Canada
Insects described in 1830